John W. Stanton is an American businessman. He is the chairman of the board of Trilogy International Partners, as well as the majority owner of the Seattle Mariners of Major League Baseball (MLB).

Early life and education
Stanton was born in 1955. A lifelong resident of the Seattle area, John Stanton went to Newport High School in Bellevue, Washington.  He earned his undergraduate degree in Whitman College in Walla Walla, Washington. He earned an MBA from Harvard Business School.

Career

Founding wireless companies
Stanton was the founder and former CEO of Western Wireless Corporation, former chairman and CEO of VoiceStream Wireless, and former chairman of the CTIA.

He became the first employee of McCaw Cellular Communications in the early 1980s. He was COO and vice chairman of McCaw Cellular in the 1980s.

After he left McCaw he founded the company that became Western Wireless Corp in 1992. From 1992 to 2005, he was at Western Wireless Corp. as CEO and chairman. He was the founder of Voicestream Wireless Corp. Between 1995 and 2003, VoiceStream Wireless had him as chairman and CEO as well, with that company renamed T-Mobile USA after an acquisition.
From 2008 until 2013 he was director and then chairman of Clearwire Corp.

Trilogy International
In 2005, he, Strive Masiyiwa, Bradley Horwitz, and others formed Trilogy International Partners. At the start, Stanton had a $295 million equity stake in Trilogy. In 2006, his net worth was $1 billion. Stanton was listed as #840 in the Forbes 2007 "Richest People" study. His net worth was estimated at US$1.1 billion.

By 2014, he had held executive roles at McCaw Cellular, Western Wireless and VoiceStream Wireless. He had also previously been chairman of Clearwire.

Stanton joined Microsoft's board of directors in July 2014. He joined the Compensation Committee of the board. He was also a director at Columbia Sportswear.

Around 2016, he joined the board of Costco. As of August 2016, Stanton was reported to own approximately US$45 million of stock holdings in Columbia Sportswear, General Communication Inc. and other companies.

He is a past chairman of the board of trustees of Whitman College. In 2018, Whitman College elected to name a newly constructed residence hall after Stanton, who had graduated in 1977.

He is still  a member of Trilogy International Partners with Theresa Gillespie and Brad Horwitz. It trades on the Toronto Stock Exchange. He is also chairman of Trilogy Equity and co-founder of Trilogy Search Partners.

Seattle Mariners
As of one 17 minority owners in the team, in April 2016, Stanton was appointed as the new CEO of the Seattle Mariners organization. Major League Baseball formally approved the sale of the Mariners to Stanton in August of that year. Stanton took over as control person from retiring chairman Howard Lincoln. Stanton became responsible for the Seattle Mariners day to day operations. In 2019, the team had few wins, with Stanton arguing the success metric to look at was player success at that time.

Boards
In 2014, he had chaired or co-chaired the Business Partnership for Early Learning, the United Way of King County campaign, the Washington Roundtable, and the Regional Transportation Commission.

Personal life
He resides in Bellevue, Washington with his wife Theresa Gillespie. They have two sons.

References

Businesspeople from Seattle
American billionaires
Whitman College alumni
Living people
Seattle Mariners owners
Harvard Business School alumni
American technology chief executives
Year of birth missing (living people)